Rufus Davidson (December 2, 1908 – December 13, 1974), known as Rufe Davis, was an American actor. He appeared in over 30 films between 1937 and 1969, including 14 of the Three Mesquiteers titles. Davis played railroad conductor Floyd Smoot on the CBS television series Petticoat Junction from 1963–1968 and in 1970 guest appearances.

Early life
Davis was raised on a farm in Vinson, Oklahoma. He was one of 12 children. He went into show business at the age of 20, adopted the name "Rufe Davis" (though he continued to use his real name in private life) and joined the Weaver Brothers and Elviry vaudeville touring company in 1929. He sang and did impressions of animal and train sounds. He would continue to perform live throughout his career. A 1949 review of his act at the Los Angeles Orpheum says, "Rufe Davis wins mitts with his rural comedy routines, imitations of instruments and train whistles." While he was in New York City in the 1930s, Davis was helpful to The Andrews Sisters at the start of their career, lending them money and helping them obtain bookings.

Radio
Beginning in 1932, Davis starred on the radio show Rufe Davis and the Radio Rubes. Davis and the Rubes were a quartet who performed comedy sketches and music. Davis and the Rubes also starred in the 1936 comedy/musical short film The City's Slicker.

Television
Davis is perhaps best known to modern audiences for his portrayal of Hooterville Cannonball train conductor Floyd Smoot on Petticoat Junction (and occasionally on Green Acres). Floyd Smoot is a happy-go-lucky and somewhat blockheaded character, similar to Gilligan on Gilligan's Island or Coach and Woody Boyd on Cheers. In the Green Acres episode "Never Trust a Little Old Lady", train engineer Charley Pratt (played by Smiley Burnette) says, "Floyd Smoot, you're a stubborn fool!" To which Floyd replies: "And that goes double for me!" He played Pete Lacey in The Lone Ranger 1949 episode 7 "Pete and Pedro."

Music
In 1964, Davis and his "Petticoat Junction" co-star Smiley Burnette released the single "Steam, Cinders and Smoke". The song was written by Burnette. Davis voiced the train sounds in the song. The single was given a limited release of around a thousand copies. Davis and Burnette perform the song in the Petticoat Junction episodes "Hooterville A-Go-Go" and "The Almost Annual Charity Show". Davis performs the song solo in the episode "Last Train to Pixley", which was filmed after Burnette's 1967 death. The B-side of the single is "Clickity Clack".

Davis sings "The Little Engine that Could" and "The Old Sow Song" on the 1966 children's record Bozo and His Pals.

Film
Davis appeared in dozens of short and feature-length films. He played "Lullaby Joslin" in 14 of the Three Mesquiteers western films. He performed as a singer in the 1937 film Cocoanut Grove, where he sings "Two Bits a Pair and "Ten Easy Lessons". And he was also known in western films for playing the comedic sidekick to such leading actors as Gene Autry.

Filmography

References

External links

1908 births
1974 deaths
American male film actors
People from Harmon County, Oklahoma
Male actors from Oklahoma
Burials at Forest Lawn Memorial Park (Hollywood Hills)
20th-century American male actors